William Franklin Willoughby (born 1867 in Alexandria, Virginia – died 1960) was an author of public administration texts including works on budgeting.  He often worked with his twin brother, Westel W. Willoughby.

He graduated from Johns Hopkins University, 1885

Family
Wife: Bessie Talbot (Appleby) Willoughby
Siblings: brother, Westel Woodbury Willoughby (1867–1945); sister, Alice Estelle Willoughby

Biography
He was born on 20 July 1867 in Alexandria, Virginia to Westel Willoughby and his wife Jennie.
Died: 6 May 1960 of a heart attack, Newport News, Virginia
Graduated from Johns Hopkins University, 1885
Siblings: brother, Westel Woodbury Willoughby (1867–1945); sister, Alice Estelle Willoughby
Wife: Bessie Talbot (Appleby) Willoughby

Leadership Positions
Statistical expert for U.S. Department of Labor, 1885
Member of International Jury of Awards, Paris Exposition of 1900
Instructor of economics at Harvard, 1901
First Director of Brookings Institution
Treasurer, secretary, and president of Executive Council of Puerto Rico of the Island of Puerto Rico, appointed Nov. 9 1901 by President Theodore Roosevelt, 1901–1909
Assistant director of U.S. Census, 1910
Member of U.S. Commission of Economy and Efficiency in Government
McCormick Professor of Jurisprudence at Princeton, 1912
Deputy legal advisor to president of China, 1914–1916
Director of the Institute for Government Research, 1916–1932
President of the American Political Science Association, 1931–1932
Consultant to the Library of Congress, 1940–1944

Publications
The Government of Modern States, The Century Co., 1919
Government Organization in War Time and After: A Survey of the Federal Civil Agencies Created for the Prosecution of the War, 1919
The National Budget System, With Suggestions for Its Improvement, The Johns Hopkins Press, 1927
Financial Condition and Operations of the National Government 1921–1930, The Brookings Institution, 1931
The Movement for Budgetary Reform in the States, D. Appleton and Co. NY. 1918

References

External links 
 
 

1867 births
1960 deaths
Johns Hopkins University alumni
Harvard University staff
Public administration scholars
American twins
People from Alexandria, Virginia
Fellows of the American Academy of Arts and Sciences